Andrzej Olechowski (b. 1947) - Polish economist and politician
Josef Olechowski (1898-1984) - Canadian-Polish lawyer and politician
Tadeusz Olechowski (1926-2001) - communist Polish politician